The Kopeka River is a river of Stewart Island/Rakiura, New Zealand. Rising east of Mount Allen, it flows south-eastward into the sea west of Toitoi Bay.

See also
List of rivers of New Zealand

References

Rivers of Stewart Island